Cryptoblepharus burdeni is a species of lizard in the family Scincidae. The species is endemic to Indonesia.

Etymology
The specific name, burdeni, is in honor of American naturalist William Douglas Burden.

Geographic range
Within Indonesia, C. burdeni is found on the islands of Flores, Komodo, and Padar.

References

Further reading
Dunn ER (1927). "Results of the Douglas Burden Expedition to the Island of Komodo. III.—Lizards from the East Indies". American Museum Novitates (288): 1–13. (Cryptoblepharus boutonii burdeni, new subspecies, pp. 11–12).

Cryptoblepharus
Reptiles described in 1927
Reptiles of Indonesia
Endemic fauna of Indonesia
Taxa named by Emmett Reid Dunn